L'Ingénu, sometimes subtitled The Sincere Huron in English, is a satirical novella by the French philosopher Voltaire, published in 1767.

Overview
The work tells the story of a Huron "child of nature" who, after having crossed the Atlantic to England, crosses into Brittany, France in the 1690s. Upon arrival, a prior notices depictions of his brother and sister-in-law, whom they deduce to be the Huron's parents – making him French; and he is christened Hercules de Kerkabon (Hercule de Kerkabon).

Having grown up outside of European culture, he sees the world in a more 'natural' way, causing him to interpret things directly, unaware of what is customary, leading to comic misinterpretations. After reading the Bible, he feels he should be circumcised and calls upon a surgeon to perform the operation (which is stopped through the intervention of his 'family'). After his first confession, he tries to force the priest to confess as well – interpreting a biblical verse to mean confessions must be made mutually and not exempting the clergy. Not expecting to be baptized in a church, they find the Child of Nature waiting in a stream, as baptisms are depicted in the Bible. The story satirizes religious doctrine, government corruption, and the folly and injustices of French society (including its practices which conflict with actual scripture).

The story also criticizes the contemporary corruption in the French government. First, the Child of Nature, on his way to receive accolades for helping fight off a British amphibious assault, is wrongly imprisoned as a Jansenist after showing sympathy to the plight of those fleeing religious persecution. He spends a great deal of time in prison, until his lover – having been sent to a convent for four years – journeys to Versailles to find out his plight. To do so, she must use back-channels, such as the wife of a confessor. Ultimately, to secure her lover's release, she must succumb to the advances of a government minister. She seeks guidance from the confessor, but he says she must have misunderstood the minister's deal, and that whatever he was intimating, it must be for the best, given that he is related to the king's confessor. This episode suggests not only the personal corruption in the French government, but the corrupt interplay of secular and religious institutions as well. She eventually gives in for the sake of her lover, but dies of an illness shortly after they are reunited.

L'Ingénu is a mix of genres; it shares characteristics with the conte philosophique, the apologue and the novel.

Throughout L'Ingénu, Voltaire advocates deism, and lambastes intolerance, fanaticism, superstitions, sects, and the Catholic clergy.

Notes

References

External links 

 
  L'Ingénu, audio version 
 L'ingénu, histoire veritable, Tirée des Manuscrits du Père Quesnel, a Utrecht, 1767.

1767 novels
French novellas
Novels by Voltaire
Novels set in Paris
French satirical novels